Sharon Karen Strzelecki is an accident-prone fictional character on the Australian comedy series Kath & Kim and is portrayed by Australian actress Magda Szubanski. The character first appeared in "Big Girl's Blouse" in 1994 alongside the other two central characters, Kath Day-Knight (Jane Turner) and Kim Craig (Gina Riley). Sharon is sports-obsessed, and unlucky in love.

In the American version of Kath & Kim, Sharon has no equivalent. The character in the American version was initially to have the name Debbie Cox and work with animals, but Szubanski, who had created Sharon, refused to permit adaptation for the show.

Personality

Physical appearance and personal outlook

Sharon is obsessed with sport, and although she is overweight and short in stature, she demonstrates skill in netball and cricket. She wears her orange-brown hair in a bob haircut. Sharon lacks confidence; she always has her head down and at times seems depressed. Other times, she is cheerful and happy especially when she is playing netball. In the majority of episodes she wears her netball cardigan with a white or pastel T-shirt; for special occasions, like Christmas or her wedding, she dresses up. Despite weight issues and inability to find love, Sharon doesn't have self-consciousness in the mirror. Sharon appears as a great person on the inside, always caring for others despite the lack of love and care (for her) in her own life. In Kath & Kimderella, Sharon goes on the Orlando Bloom diet and after going to the toilet loses a large amount of weight; during the show's hiatus, Magda Szubanski had gone on the Jenny Craig diet and lost a lot of weight. However Sharon is still fat (as told to by Kim Craig) and can't sing the Australian national anthem. She enjoys eating KFC as seen in Da Kath & Kim Code. 

"I've never thought that the gag of Sharon is the weight. I've always said the thing that defines Sharon is netball. What I based her on was those kind of people who, on a cold, wet Saturday morning, get up and they get the bibs and the balls and they teach junior netball and don't get paid for it but they have that sense of civic duty." – Magda Szubanski

Hobbies
Sharon's main interest is sports, and sports uniforms (summer and winter) make up the entirety of her wardrobe. She is particularly active in netball, where she is team captain of the Sapphires (and also the Unicorns only in season 2 "my boyfriend"), and indoor cricket. However, she is known to have golfed and to have participated in shot put at the national level. She often makes reference to it in the series, and says her mother (if she met her) would be "pleased" with her that she has found success in the Sporting Arena. Sharon also watches football, cricket and Rugby. She enjoys eating in addition, usually will barge into the Day residence and open up a box of snacks; which Kim walks in and scolds Sharon for stealing her snack. When Kim won the battle of foods, she will barge into the Day residence and open up a box of snacks that were won by Kim, she cries heavily when they are none left. Sharon also takes an interest in Kim's (and occasionally Kath's) life, and often unquestioningly aids Kim in her bizarre and frivolous endeavours. Sharon has played Indoor Cricket in 4 different states.

Relationships

Love life and romantic relationships
Sharon has a terrible love life, and is described by viewers and characters in the show as "unlucky in love", mainly by Kath who feels great compassion for Sharon. Sharon has come close to having relationships numerous times, each unsuccessful. In Da Kath & Kim Code she was precipitously close to being married; however, at the end of the tele-movie she revealed that her fiancée "Marriat" was in fact just spam on a computer website. Sharon had relationships with Kim's husband Brett (before and after their marriage). Mark is Sharon's ex-boyfriend. Mark sometimes shows Sharon he loves her, otherwise isn't very much interested her. They are on again and off again. Sharon nearly loses him to a Leggy River Dancer. Sharon took notice of Kel's friend (who steals all of his girlfriends) Sandy Freckle, however Sandy (going for Kel's women usually) only notices Kath. Sharon also had a small romantic relationship with her co-hospital worker, Alan (Alan Brough), but they never had a serious relationship. It was revealed that Sharon uses chocolate to fill the need for love (as seen in the episode "Lust"). Sharon "pashed" (Australian slang for vigorous kissing) and "married" the late Australian cricketing legend Shane Warne. She also "pashed" the late Australian actor Heath Ledger on the red carpet at the AFI awards in 2006 while in the role of Sharon, acting as an assistant stage manager.

Kim

Kim is Sharon's friend, however to Kim, Sharon is just her second best friend. The two have a very odd friendship. Sharon is always nice to Kim, being there for her and for her family; however Kim appears as rude, lazy and careless for Sharon (unless she wants something, as she says to Sharon: Sharon, because you are my second best friend [and she continues on to say what she wants]). Kim is always belittling Sharon, calling her good-for-nothing and always lacks her ability in love (despite that it is evident she is correct at some points). Kim is extremely ambivalent that Sharon and Brett (Kim's husband), have a great friendship. Kim also takes advantage of Sharon's good nature, such as driving Kim and Epponnee-Rae to different places, even when she has better things to do.

Brett
Brett, or "Bretty" as Sharon likes to call him, is Kim's husband and a good friend of Sharon's. However, during the episode in which Epponnee-Rae was born—it was revealed that Sharon and Brett used to date in high-school; however once Brett saw Kim (who showed him no feelings or affection) he turned away from Sharon. This saw the audience understand why Sharon dreams of being with Brett. In one episode, Sharon said that she wanted to have a child on her own using a donor, and hinted out she wanted Brett to be that person, stating "I want a person who is the husband of a close friend...and has a baby like Epponnee Rae, to be the father." In the last season, Sharon and Brett slept together and Kim found them. It changed nothing, except demoting Sharon to Kim's "sixth best friend".

Kath Day-Knight

Sharon Strzelecki is Kath's daughter's second-best friend. During the series Kath and Sharon like each other, Kath is usually the one standing up for Sharon when Kim throws a tantrum at Sharon (usually concerning food). The only time Kath is seen throwing a tantrum at Sharon is when her drink was spiked in the episode "Party" and when she once told Sharon to get help before a volleyball game.

Kel Knight

Wayne Shaun
Wayne Shaun (played by Shane Warne) is a Shane Warne impersonator to whom Sharon married. In the last episode, Sharon was waiting for Wayne to show up, but he appeared not to. He eventually did, and they married. At the end of the episode, Sharon walked into Kath's home depressed, stating that Wayne had bought a mobile phone. Their marriage seemed to have ended, however it is unknown. In the credits of the episode, Wayne was in the spa with Kath and Kim talking about how he can win Sharon back.

Family

Parents
Little is known of Sharon's parents and there is considerable discrepancy in terms of the continuity of the show's storyline on this issue. As far as Sharon's father is concerned, she laments in one episode that "he moved with his new family to Tewantin". In another episode, after Kim and Brett are forced once again to move back in with Kath and Kel, Sharon shows up at the door and announces that she has lost her job and her apartment because her father (who presumably owned the place) came back to renovate and raise the rent.

Things are even more muddled when it comes to Sharon's mother. In one episode of Series 1 (Hen's Night) Sharon and Kim have a squabble over the fact that Kim's hen's night (planned and hosted by Sharon) was not as good as it should have been because Sharon was conflicted by the need to care for her ill mother who, according to Kim, had a "dicky pancreas" at the time and didn't even bother to call and offer congratulations. To this Sharon replies that her mother was in a coma during the hen's night and had no access to a phone. Clearly, at this point in the show, Sharon's mother was envisioned as being very much a part of her daughter's adult life. A complete break of continuity with that idea is evidenced by a Series 4 episode in which Sharon states that her mother abandoned her as a baby and went to Britain never to be seen or heard from again, and where her mother had presumably remarried and had given birth to a younger, previously unknown half-sister, Karen (Matt Lucas).

Karen
Karen Is Sharon's half sister. She has only made two appearances in the series. In the episode "Roots" in which Sharon set out a goal to meet her birth mother. She ended up finding out she had a sister Karen. Karen, portrayed by Matt Lucas arrived in Melbourne as she was already in Australia modelling. She is a plus sized model and travels a lot. When Sharon met Karen, she brought Kim with her. Sharon was completely ignored by Karen, who spent all of her time being best friends with Kim. Before Karen left, she kissed Brett forcibly to which Kim nor Sharon reacted to. Before Sharon's marriage to Wayne—she played a video message which Karen left for her. Karen stated that she would not attend Sharon's marriage Nuptials and also said that "Even Though mother has never met you, She does hate you!". Karen is treated like a princess (as she claims) by their mother and said she grew up with everything she ever wanted, making Sharon feel bad.

Quirks, personality traits and features
There are several things Sharon says and does which feature repeatedly through the series. Several relate to Kath's fridge. Sharon often enters the house through the slide door, and heads straight to Kath's fridge and begins to eat whatever she can get her hands on (usually frankfurts). Frequently, she eats the last of Kim's Dippity Bix or fat-free Fruche. This causes Kim to exclaim "Sharon! That was my last ___!", to which Sharon responds "Well, I didn't know, Kim!" Kim finishes the gag with the line "Well you never bloody know, Sharon!"

Sharon is often seen with an injury of some sort, and regularly appears wearing a cast or splint, neck brace, eye patch, etc. On other occasions, she is shown with 'pash rash' (as Kim calls it), boils, or carbuncles. Many of these injuries and afflictions are assumed to be incurred from playing sport, however a particularly grotesque dermatological affliction on her face is the result of a monkey bite sustained while visiting the island of Bali. She has also broken her fibula five times.

As an avid cricket fan, she is a huge fan of Shane Warne. She is often seen reading his books and attempting "the flipper". In season four, she married a Shane Warne look-alike and during the morning of her wedding is seen with two pictures of Shane Warne, one picture of a younger Warne, the other, a matured, older one (which the lookalike resembled, although both pictures are obviously of Warne). When Sharon kisses somebody, red marks appear around her mouth and she has a smile on her face.

In other media
Szubanski has appeared "in character" as Sharon Strzelecki a number of times outside Kath & Kim. In 2005 she appeared in a televised fundraiser for victims of the 2004 Boxing Day Tsunami. In 2019-2020 she appeared in advertisements for Uber Eats alongside Kim Kardashian. In 2020 she released a tribute video for health workers during the COVID-19 pandemic.

See also
Strzelecki (disambiguation)

Other characters
Kim Craig
Kath Day-Knight
Kel Knight
Brett Craig

References

Strzelecki,Sharon
Female characters in television
Fictional bisexual females
Fictional people from Victoria (Australia)